Africa's Children-Africa's Future  (AC-AF) was founded in 2006 and was recognized as a registered charity in 2009. The organization conducted programming in Canada  and Tanzania  to encourage the empowerment of children and youth in response to the various challenges posed by the AIDS  pandemic. AC-AF's programming offered grassroots responses and sustainable solutions to build, strengthen and support community resources. Due to significant reforms in funding opportunities, the organization was forced to close its doors in 2014.

Organizational structure

Governance 
AC-AF was governed by a board of directors. The board had varying roles throughout the organization's lifespan from advising to engaging directly in fundraising and programme management.

Operations 
Day-to-day operations in Tanzania and Canada were overseen by an Executive Director. The Executive Director reported directly to the Board of Directors. The Tanzanian team was overseen by a Country Supervisor. A Programme Manager reported to the Country Supervisor. Junior Project Officers and volunteers reported to the Programme Manager. The Canadian team was staffed by interns and volunteers who reported to the Executive Director.

Programming 
AC-AF's programming reached an incredibly wide audience. The organization assisted approximately 8000 children and youth.  It primarily worked with orphans and vulnerable children in Tanzania.

Orphans and Vulnerable Children Program 
The Orphans and Vulnerable Children Support Programme (OVCSP) was a holistic, rights based framework that aimed to secure a better future for children affected by AIDS. AC-AF emphasized the direct link between children affected by AIDS and structural inequities and systemic challenges that must be overcome for lasting change to occur. AC-AF's approach involved weekly group meetings for participants, individual and family meetings, and coordination with relevant institutions (e.g. schools).
The programme had six main elements that all children and youth enrolled in programming participated in:
 Gender equality – AC-AF provided equal opportunities for boys and girls through all programming.
 Access to education – AC-AF worked to ensure that all children in the programming were provided with a formal education through the government education system.
 Access to Healthcare – AC-AF promoted children and youth having a better understanding of the steps they could take to remain healthy and to ensure appropriate treatment when required.  AC-AF also focused on strengthening adherence for those children living with HIV and on anti-retroviral treatment
 Psychosocial Support - Psychosocial Support  (PSS) is an approach that aims to deal with both the ongoing psychological and social effects of a situation on a person by developing coping mechanisms to overcome challenges presented in every day life. The children that AC-AF worked with faced significant challenges as a result of living with HIV or having lost loved ones (particularly parents) as a result of AIDS-related diseases.
 Microcredit loans and community banking – Families were provided with microcredit  loans to ensure they had adequate food and all school related costs were paid. All loan repayments (with a low rate of interest) were made to the community account allowing new families to be invited into the programme. There were two key differences between the micro-credit models of other organizations and that of AC-AF. First, AC-AF provided loans to people under the age of 18. This was the only known programme of its kind in the world. Secondly, while microcredit loans are generally used to develop entrepreneurial initiatives, the purpose of AC-AF's loans was for the basic living costs and educational fees.
 Youth Professional Development – Youth Professional Development (YPD) provided work placements similar to apprenticeships in a variety of local businesses. This training and apprenticeship included varied expertise from skilled trades to accounting and other professional disciplines.

Homework Club 
A range of activities were used to encourage a better understanding of topics taught in school, as well as to enhance students' English skills. The Homework Club looked to go beyond traditional teaching methods found in the schools by providing a safe and stimulating environment in which to learn. It exposed the children to new ideas and ways of learning that helped them understand the concepts they were learning in school and develop their creativity. Activities included:
 Computer skills
 Computer-based learning
 Art projects
 Individual reading (English and Swahili)
 Story-telling
 Numeracy skills
  Games – each game focused on an element of learning
This programme also included the development of a small library to include fiction (in English and Swahili), non-fiction, and a collection of primary school textbooks for all year groups. The availability of textbooks within the AC-AF library allowed participants (including OVCSP participants) to have direct access to them, which they otherwise would not have had.

u+me=we 
u+me=we was an education and awareness programme that empowered children and youth to actively engage in the issues surrounding HIV and AIDS. It included 3 specifically tailored workshops and used art to allow participants to creatively learn and express their ideas and reactions. Working through schools, community centres and other groups serving vulnerable children, AC-AF provided a safe environment where children could ask the questions that they otherwise found too embarrassing to ask.
In Tanzania, Workshop 1 & 2 involved two intensive workshops that provided information about HIV and AIDS. Information was comprehensive and was based on the prevalence of HIV in Tanzania and the daily impact on the community. Topics covered included:
 What are HIV and AIDS?
 Preventing the sexual transmission of HIV
 Sexuality, HIV Transmission and Safer Sex (inc. condom demonstrations)
 Preventing the Non-Sexual Transmission of HIV
 Testing
 Symptoms
 Treatment
 The Social and Structural Impacts of HIV and AIDS
 Gender and HIV

Workshop 3 involved expression through art. AC-AF introduced the participants to a u+me=we art project, which gave them an opportunity to express their opinions and share these expressions with youth around the world. This workshop allowed for a reflection of cultural influence in our understanding of the disease. The artwork that children and youth provided in these workshops was then used to create awareness on a local and global scale.

In Canada, this programme was largely the same structure, although also included a section on global inequities and their impact on children and youth.
Over the course of the organization's life it conducted over 300 workshops.

Additionally, u+me=we programming focused on general outreach and awareness about HIV and AIDS to the greater community. This was achieved through exhibitions and showcases of artwork that participants completed. The largest awareness event was the Walk the Truth Gala Event at the National Art Gallery of Canada during Ottawa Fashion Week 2011 which featured talent from fashion, art and entertainment during a charitable fundraiser.

World AIDS Day events 
AC-AF volunteers and staff conducted several World AIDS Day (WAD) Activities in Canada and Tanzania. In Canada, the most visible event was fundraising at TTC (Toronto Transit Commission) stations. This fundraising helped cover the organization's operating budget, while also increasing awareness of the organization's mandate and work. In Tanzania, WAD events were held annually for children, youth and the greater community. The days were filled with arts-based outreach and awareness performances and activities that highlighted components of u+me=we initiatives.

Funders 

AC-AF achieved its success due to the generous donations from individuals, corporations as well as foundations and organizations. The granting institutions included:
 Athletes for Africa (A4A)
 City of Toronto government (Global AIDS Initiative)
 Dar es Salaam Goat Races
 Diplomatic Spouses Group (Tanzania)
 Google Grants
 M.A.C. World AIDS Fund
 Schools Without Borders (SWB)
 The Nightingale Company

Recognition 
 AIDS 2014 Logo Design: Assisted in the facilitation of Yohana Haule's entry into the youth competition which he then went on to win

Closure 
AC-AF's Board of Directors announced its closure at the end of 2014, thanking all of their stakeholders.

"AC-AF is deeply disappointed by the fact that it cannot continue, but, is comforted by the knowledge that its programming has helped participants build a foundation for their future endeavors and assisted in developing the skills necessary to succeed. The hard work, dedication and commitment of the entire AC-AF family are celebrated. AC-AF is incredibly thankful and proud of the tremendous belief in- and support of- AC-AF's mission. Together we have made a real difference in the lives of many."

References

External links 
 2012 Presentation at World AIDS Conference
 2010 Presentation at World AIDS Conference

Health charities in Canada
Foreign charities operating in Tanzania
HIV/AIDS organizations